This is a list of adult animated television series of the 2010s (including streaming television series); that is, animated programs targeted towards audiences aged 18 and over in mind. Works in this medium could be considered adult for any number of reasons, which include the incorporation of explicit or suggestive sexual content, graphic violence, profane language, dark humour, or other thematic elements inappropriate for children. Works in this genre may explore philosophical, political, or social issues. Some productions are noted for their complex and/or experimental storytelling and animation techniques. Adult animation is typically defined as animation which skews toward adults. It is also described as something that "formative youths should stay far, far away from" or has adult humor and comes in various styles, but especially sitcoms and comedies. These animations can also "appeal to wide swaths of viewers," including those aged 18–34. AdWeek called adult animation "animated projects aimed at grown-ups, not kids."

In North America, there is children's animation, adult animation, and young adult animation, with various mature animations in the United States, especially in television series. This page mainly includes series in North America and Europe, on programming blocks such as Adult Swim, Animation Domination, Adult Swim (in Canada), and others, with other mature animations, including web series and animated films covered on other pages. These series should not be confused with cartoon pornography or hentai.

List

United States

United Kingdom

Canada

Latin America and Brazil

France

Australia

South Korea

Co-productions

Pilots

Unaired

See also
 List of adult animated television series
 List of adult animated television series before 1990
 List of adult animated television series of the 1990s
 LGBT representation in adult animation
 Modern animation in the United States
 Lists of animated feature films
 Independent animation
 Animation in the United States in the television era
 Cartoon violence

Notes

References

Citations

Sources
 
 
 

 
Adult
Television series
Adult